Plaza de Toros de La Ribera is a bullring in Logroño, Spain. It is currently used for bull fighting, with a retractable roof, has also hosted basketball and 2010 Davis Cup tennis. The stadium holds 11,046 spectators. It was opened in 2001.

See also
 List of indoor arenas in Spain

References

La Ribera
Sports venues in La Rioja (Spain)
Indoor arenas in Spain